Highland is a city in Sharp County, Arkansas, United States. The city was incorporated in 1998 and is located in Sharp County. It is the fourth largest city in Sharp County with a population of 982 in 2020

Geography
Highland is located at  (36.269749, -91.521773).

Demographics

2020 census

As of the 2020 United States census, there were 982 people, 454 households, and 277 families residing in the city.

2000 census
As of the census of 2000, there were 986 people, 403 households, and 309 families residing in the city. The racial makeup of the city was 98.07% White, 0.41% Native American, 0.20% Asian, 0.10% from other races, and 1.22% from two or more races.  1.42% of the population were Hispanic or Latino of any race.

There were 403 households, out of which 29.5% had children under the age of 18 living with them, 60.3% were married couples living together, 10.9% had a female householder with no husband present, and 23.1% were non-families. 20.8% of all households were made up of individuals, and 9.7% had someone living alone who was 65 years of age or older.  The average household size was 2.45 and the average family size was 2.78.

In the city, the population was spread out, with 24.3% under the age of 18, 6.1% from 18 to 24, 23.3% from 25 to 44, 25.7% from 45 to 64, and 20.6% who were 65 years of age or older.  The median age was 42 years. For every 100 females, there were 98.8 males.  For every 100 females age 18 and over, there were 96.3 males.

The median income for a household in the city was $28,929, and the median income for a family was $32,788. Males had a median income of $25,357 versus $15,938 for females. The per capita income for the city was $14,589.  About 13.0% of families and 18.2% of the population were below the poverty line, including 25.2% of those under age 18 and 9.6% of those age 65 or over.

Education
Public education for elementary and secondary school students is provided by Highland School District, which leads to graduation from Highland High School. Highland School Districts serves Ash Flat, Hardy, Highland and Cherokee Village.

References

External links
Highland School District

Cities in Arkansas
Cities in Sharp County, Arkansas